Solo is a 2006 Australian film directed by Morgan O'Neill and starring Colin Friels.

Plot
The film is set in modern-day (2005) Sydney, Australia. Barrett (Colin Friels) is a loner who works for a group of illegitimate businessman called "The Gentlemen" as a contractor, specializing in assassinations and disposing of bodies. But he has had enough and wants to retire to a quiet life of fishing in a coastal town far away. "The Gentlemen", (top man Arkan, his associates Louis and Nguyen and Barrett's "handler", boxing promoter Reno) have no wish to lose his services, but offer him his freedom if he will murder a university student who has been over-enthusiastically delving into their part in the Sydney crime scene, the subject of her thesis. Barrett, who has befriended her, instead fakes her murder and the two take off for distant parts. That evening, after a heavy drinking session during which he confesses to her of his criminal past, she kills him. She answers a phone call from Reno, who is surprised that she has killed Barrett, but as a murderer she now has no choice but to work for him.

Cast
The players included:
Colin Friels as "Jack Barrett", hit man
Angie Milliken as "Kate", his favorite prostitute
Vince Colosimo as "Philip Keeling", crooked Assistant Commissioner of Police
Bojana Novakovic as "Billie Finn", the relentless honours student
Chris Haywood as "Arkan", crime boss
Tony Barry as "Louis" (pron. "Lewis"), subordinate of Arkan, a blackjack player
Linal Haft as "Reno", boxing promoter and Barrett's handler
Anh Do as "Nguyen", importer and black marketeer
Brian Harrison as "Havana", old jazz pianist

Production
The film was made after Morgan O'Neill's script was voted winner for Project Greenlight in Australia.

Sound track
The film featured a sound track of "cool" modern jazz, played by Martyn Love (piano), Michael Bartolomei (piano), Damian de Boos-Smith (guitar and keyboards), Dale Barlow (tenor saxophone, bass clarinet and flute), Phillip Slater (trumpet), Cameron Undy (acoustic bass guitar), Martin Highland (drums), Fiona Adie (vocal textures). Pieces "Cross on ya" and "Hunter" were written by King Brown and Damian de Boos-Smith and performed by King Brown. "The Phone Call" was written by Toby Roberts and performed by The Telltales.

A CD titled "Solo Original Australian Motion Picture Soundtrack By Martyn Love & Damian De Boos-Smith" containing much of the sound track was released.

References

External links

Australian crime drama films
Films directed by Morgan O'Neill
2006 films
2000s English-language films